, formerly known as Diamond City Hana, is a large shopping center and is part of the Japanese Æon Group chain of shopping centers.  Æon Mall Kyoto Gojō houses a wide selection of popular retail stores, an Æon department store, numerous restaurants, fast food shops, and a large game center.

Location
AEON MALL Kyōto-Gojō is located on the north east corner of the intersection of Gojo street and Nishikoji street in Kyoto city, Kyoto Prefecture, Japan.

Address: 25-1, Saiin-oiwake-cho, Ukyo-ku, Kyoto-shi, Kyoto, Japan.

Restaurants
Saizeriya
Cafés: Sanmaruku café, and Starbucks
Fast food locations: MOS Burger, McDonald's, KFC, and Baskin Robbins

See also
 List of shopping malls in Japan

External links

 

Aeon Group
Shopping centres in Japan
Buildings and structures in Kyoto